North Macedonia, officially the Republic of North Macedonia, is a landlocked country in Southeast Europe. It shares land borders with Kosovo to the northwest, Serbia to the north, Bulgaria to the east, Greece to the south, and Albania to the west. It constitutes approximately the northern third of the larger geographical region of Macedonia. Skopje, the capital and largest city, is home to a quarter of the country's 1.83 million people. The majority of the residents are ethnic Macedonians, a South Slavic people. Albanians form a significant minority at around 25%, followed by Turks, Romani, Serbs, Bosniaks, Aromanians and a few other minorities.

The region's history begins with the kingdom of Paeonia, a mixed Thraco-Illyrian polity. In the late sixth century BC, the area was subjugated by the Persian Achaemenid Empire, then incorporated into the Kingdom of Macedonia in the fourth century BC. The Roman Republic conquered the region in the second century BC and made it part of the larger province of Macedonia. The area remained part of the Byzantine Empire, but was often raided and settled by Slavic tribes beginning in the sixth century of the Christian era. Following centuries of contention between the Bulgarian, Byzantine, and Serbian Empires, it was part of the Ottoman Empire from the mid-14th until the early 20th century, when, following the Balkan Wars of 1912 and 1913, the modern territory of North Macedonia came under Serbian rule.

During the First World War, the territory was ruled by Bulgaria, but after the end of the war it returned to Serbian rule as part of the newly formed Kingdom of Serbs, Croats and Slovenes. During the Second World War, it was again ruled by Bulgaria; and in 1945 it was established as a constituent state of communist Yugoslavia, which it remained until its peaceful secession in 1991. The country became a member of the United Nations in April 1993, but as a result of a dispute with Greece over the name "Macedonia", it was admitted under the provisional description "the former Yugoslav Republic of Macedonia" (abbreviated as "FYR Macedonia" or "FYROM"). In June 2018, Macedonia and Greece resolved the dispute with an agreement that the country should rename itself "Republic of North Macedonia". This renaming came into effect in February 2019.

A unitary parliamentary constitutional republic, North Macedonia is a member of the UN, NATO, the Council of Europe, the World Bank, OSCE, CEFTA, BSEC and the WTO. Since 2005, it has also been a candidate for joining the European Union. North Macedonia is an upper-middle-income country according to the World Bank's definitions and has undergone considerable economic reform since its independence in developing an open economy. It is a developing country, ranked 82nd on the Human Development Index; and provides social security, a universal health care system, and free primary and secondary education to its citizens.

Names and etymology

The state's name derives from the Greek word  (Makedonía), a kingdom (later, region) named after the ancient Macedonians. Their name,  (Makedónes), ultimately derives from the ancient Greek adjective μακεδνός (makednós), meaning 'tall' or 'taper', which shares the same root as the adjective  (makrós, 'long, tall, high') in ancient Greek. The name is believed to have originally meant either 'highlanders' or 'the tall ones', possibly descriptive of the people. According to linguist Robert S. P. Beekes, both terms are of pre-Greek substrate origin and cannot be explained in terms of Indo-European morphology. However, according to linguist Filip De Decker, Beekes's arguments are insufficient.

The name Macedonia was largely forgotten as a geographical denomination through the Byzantine and Ottoman era but was revived by Bulgarian and Greek nationalist movements from the early 19th century. It was revived only in middle of the century, with the rise of nationalism in the Ottoman Empire. In the early 20th century the region was already a national cause, contested among Bulgarian, Greek and Serbian nationalists. During the interwar period the use of the name Macedonia was prohibited in the Kingdom of Yugoslavia, due to the implemented policy of Serbianisation of the local Slavic-speakers. The name Macedonia was adopted officially for the first time at the end of the Second World War by the new Socialist Republic of Macedonia, which became one of the six constituent countries of the Socialist Federal Republic of Yugoslavia. After the fall of Communism, with the beginning of the breakup of Yugoslavia, this federal entity declared independence and changed its official name to the Republic of Macedonia in 1991. Prior to June 2018, the use of the name Macedonia was disputed between Greece and the then-Republic of Macedonia.

The Prespa agreement of June 2018 saw the country change its name to the Republic of North Macedonia eight months later. A non-binding national referendum on the matter passed with 90% approval but did not reach the required 50% turnout amidst a boycott, leaving the final decision with parliament to ratify the result. Parliament approved of the name change on 19 October, reaching the required two-thirds majority needed to enact constitutional changes. The vote to amend the constitution and change the name of the country passed on 11 January 2019 in favour of the amendment. The amendment entered into force on 12 February, following the ratification of the Prespa agreement and the Protocol on the Accession of North Macedonia to NATO by the Greek Parliament. Despite the renaming, the country is unofficially referred to as 'Macedonia' by most of its citizens and most of the local media outlets.

History

Early history 

North Macedonia geographically roughly corresponds to the ancient kingdom of Paeonia, which was located immediately north of the ancient kingdom of Macedonia. Paeonia was inhabited by the Paeonians, a Thracian people, whilst the northwest was inhabited by the Dardani and the southwest by tribes known historically as the Enchelae, Pelagones, and Lyncestae; the latter two are generally regarded as Molossian tribes of the northwestern Greek group, whilst the former two are considered Illyrian. The headwaters of the Axios river are mentioned by Homer as the home of the Paeonians allies of Troy.

In the late 6th century BC, the Achaemenid Persians under Darius the Great conquered the Paeonians, incorporating what is today North Macedonia within their vast territories. Following the loss in the Second Persian invasion of Greece in 479 BC, the Persians eventually withdrew from their European territories, including from what is today North Macedonia.

Philip II of Macedon absorbed the regions of Upper Macedonia (Lynkestis and Pelagonia) and the southern part of Paeonia (Deuriopus) into the kingdom of Macedon in 356 BC. Philip's son Alexander the Great conquered the remainder of the region and incorporated it in his empire, reaching as far north as Scupi, but the city and the surrounding area remained part of Dardania. After the death of Alexander, Celtic armies began to bear down on the southern regions, threatening the kingdom of Macedon. In 310 BC, they attacked the area, but were defeated.

The Romans established the province of Macedonia in 146 BC. By the time of Diocletian, the province had been subdivided between Macedonia Prima ("first Macedonia") on the south, encompassing most of the kingdom of Macedon, and Macedonia Salutaris (meaning "wholesome Macedonia", known also as Macedonia Secunda, "second Macedonia") on the north, encompassing partially Dardania and the whole of Paeonia; most of the country's modern boundaries fell within the latter, with the city of Stobi as its capital. Roman expansion brought the Scupi area under Roman rule in the time of Domitian (81–96 AD), and it fell within the Province of Moesia. Whilst Greek remained the dominant language in the eastern part of the Roman empire, especially south of the Jireček Line, Latin spread to some extent in Macedonia.

Mediaeval period 

Slavic tribes settled in the Balkan region including North Macedonia by the late 6th century AD. They were led by Pannonian Avars. The Slavs settled on places of earlier settlements and probably merged later with the local populations to form mixed Byzantine-Slavic communities.  Historical records document that in  a Bulgar ruler called Kuber led a group of largely Christians called Sermesianoi who were his subjects, and they settled in the region of Pelagonia. They may have consisted of Bulgars, Byzantines, Slavs and even Germanic tribes. There is no more information of Kuber's life. Presian's reign apparently coincides with the extension of Bulgarian control over the Slavic tribes in and around Macedonia. The Slavic tribes that settled in the region of Macedonia converted to Christianity around the 9th century during the reign of Tsar Boris I of Bulgaria. The Ohrid Literary School became one of the two major cultural centres of the First Bulgarian Empire, along with the Preslav Literary School. Established in Ohrid in 886 by Saint Clement of Ohrid on the order of Boris I, the Ohrid Literary School was involved in the spreading of the Cyrillic script.

After Sviatoslav's invasion of Bulgaria, the Byzantines took control of East Bulgaria. Samuil, one of the Cometopuli brothers, was proclaimed Tsar of Bulgaria. He moved the capital to Skopje and then to Ohrid, which had been the cultural and military centre of southwestern Bulgaria since Boris I's rule. Samuil re-established Bulgarian power, but after several decades of conflicts, in 1014, the Byzantine Emperor Basil II defeated his armies, and within four years the Byzantines restored control over the Balkans (modern-day North Macedonia was included into a new province, called Bulgaria) for the first time since the 7th century. The rank of the autocephalous Bulgarian Patriarchate was lowered due to its subjugation to Constantinople and it was transformed into the Archbishopric of Ohrid. By the late 12th century, Byzantine decline saw the region contested by various political entities, including a brief Norman occupation in the 1080s.

In the early 13th century, a revived Bulgarian Empire gained control of the region. Plagued by political difficulties, the empire did not last, and the region came once again under Byzantine control in the early 14th century. In the 14th century, it became part of the Serbian Empire. Skopje became the capital of Tsar Stefan Dušan's empire. Following Dušan's death, a weak successor appeared, and power struggles between nobles divided the Balkans once again. These events coincided with the entry of the Ottoman Turks into Europe.

Ottoman period

The Kingdom of Prilep was one of the short-lived states that emerged from the collapse of the Serbian Empire in the 14th century, which was seized by the Ottomans at the end of the same century. Gradually, all of the central Balkans were conquered by the Ottoman Empire and remained under its domination for five centuries as part of the province or Eyalet of Rumelia. The name Rumelia (Turkish: Rumeli) means "Land of the Romans" in Turkish, referring to the lands conquered by the Ottoman Turks from the Byzantine Empire. Over the centuries Rumelia Eyalet was reduced in size through administrative reforms, until by the 19th century it consisted of a region of central Albania and western North Macedonia with its capital at Manastir or present-day Bitola. Rumelia Eyalet was abolished in 1867 and that territory of Macedonia subsequently became part of vilayets of Manastir, Kosova and Selanik until the end of Ottoman rule in 1912. With the beginning of the Bulgarian National Revival in the 19th century, many of the reformers were from this region, including the Miladinov brothers, Rajko Žinzifov, Joakim Krčovski, Kiril Pejčinoviḱ and others. The bishoprics of Skopje, Debar, Bitola, Ohrid, Veles, and Strumica voted to join the Bulgarian Exarchate after it was established in 1870.

Modern period

Macedonian autonomism 

Several movements whose goals were the establishment of an autonomous Macedonia, which would encompass the entire region of Macedonia, began to arise in the late 19th century; the earliest of these was the Bulgarian Macedonian-Adrianople Revolutionary Committees, later becoming Secret Macedonian-Adrianople Revolutionary Organization (SMARO). In 1905 it was renamed the Internal Macedonian-Adrianople Revolutionary Organization (IMARO), and after World War I the organisation separated into the Internal Macedonian Revolutionary Organization (IMRO) and the Internal Thracian Revolutionary Organisation (ITRO).

In the early years of the organisation, membership eligibility was exclusive to Bulgarians, but later it was extended to all inhabitants of European Turkey regardless of ethnicity or religion. The majority of its members were Macedonian Bulgarians. In 1903, IMRO organised the Ilinden–Preobrazhenie Uprising against the Ottomans, which after some initial successes, including the forming of the Kruševo Republic, was crushed with much loss of life. The uprising and the forming of the Kruševo Republic are considered the cornerstone and precursors to the eventual establishment of the Macedonian state. The leaders of the Ilinden uprising are celebrated as national heroes in North Macedonia. The names of IMRO revolutionaries like Gotse Delchev, Pitu Guli, Dame Gruev and Yane Sandanski were included into the lyrics of the national anthem of the state of North Macedonia "Denes nad Makedonija" ("Today over Macedonia"). The major national holiday of North Macedonia, the Republic Day, is celebrated on 2 August, Ilinden (St. Elijah day), the day of the Ilinden uprising.

Kingdom of Serbia

Following the two Balkan Wars of 1912 and 1913 and the dissolution of the Ottoman Empire, most of its European-held territories were divided between Greece, Bulgaria and Serbia. Almost the territory that was to become North Macedonia was annexed by Serbia conforming to the treaty of peace concluded at Bucharest. However, Strumica region was passed to Bulgaria. Following the partition, an anti-Bulgarian campaign was carried out in the areas under Serbian and Greek control. As many as 641 Bulgarian schools and 761 churches were closed by the Serbs, while Exarchist clergy and teachers were expelled. The use of all Macedonian dialects and standard Bulgarian were proscribed. IMRO, together with local Albanians, organised the Ohrid–Debar uprising against the Serbian rule. Within a few days the rebels captured the towns of Gostivar, Struga and Ohrid, expelling the Serbian troops. According to the Carnegie Endowment for International Peace report, a Serbian army of 100,000 regulars suppressed the uprising. Many were killed and tens of thousands refugees fled to Bulgaria and Albania.

World War I 

During the First World War, most of today's North Macedonia was part of the Bulgarian occupied zone of Serbia after the country was invaded by the Central Powers in the fall of 1915. The region was known as the "Military Inspection Area of Macedonia" and was administered by a Bulgarian military commander. A policy of Bulgarisation of the region and its population was immediately initiated, during the period the IMRO arose from a clandestine organisation to serve as gendarmerie, taking control of the whole police structure, enforcing the Bulgarisation of the region. According to Robert Gerwarth, the Bulgarian denationalisation policy, including its paramilitary aspect, was almost identical in its intent and execution to the Serbian policy that preceded it.

Bulgarian language was to be exclusively used, Serbian Cyrillic was forbidden, Serbian priests were arrested and deported, Serbian-sounding names had to be changed to Bulgarian ones, school teachers were brought from Bulgaria while Serbian books were taken from schools and libraries and publicly destroyed. Adult males were sent to labour camps or forced to join the Bulgarian Army, representatives of the Serbian intelligentsia were deported  or executed. According to Paul Mojzes the aim of the Bulgarian government was to create pure Bulgarian territories by denationalising the non-Bulgarian Slavic population of Macedonia.

Kingdom of Yugoslavia

After the capitulation of Bulgaria and the end of the First World War, the area returned under Belgrade control as part of the newly formed Kingdom of Serbs, Croats and Slovenes and saw a reintroduction of anti-Bulgarian measures. Bulgarian teachers and clergy were expelled, Bulgarian language signs and books removed, and all Bulgarian organisations dissolved. Also after the Treaty of Neuilly-sur-Seine, the Strumica region was annexed to Serbian Macedonia in 1919.

The Serbian government pursued a policy of forced Serbianisation in the region, which included systematic suppression of Bulgarian activists, altering family surnames, internal colonisation, exploiting workers, and intense propaganda. To aid the implementation of this policy, some 50,000 Serbian army and gendarmerie were stationed in present-day North Macedonia. By 1940 about 280 Serbian colonies (comprising 4,200 families) were established as part of the government's internal colonisation program (initial plans envisaged 50,000 families settling in present-day North Macedonia).

In 1929, the Kingdom was officially renamed the Kingdom of Yugoslavia, and divided into provinces called banovinas. South Serbia, including all of present-day North Macedonia, became the Vardar Banovina of the Kingdom of Yugoslavia.

The Internal Macedonian Revolutionary Organization (IMRO) promoted the concept of an Independent Macedonia in the interwar period. Its leaders—including Todor Alexandrov, Aleksandar Protogerov, and Ivan Mihailov—promoted independence of the Macedonian territory split between Serbia and Greece for the whole population, regardless of religion and ethnicity. The Bulgarian government of Alexander Malinov in 1918 offered to give Pirin Macedonia for that purpose after World War I, but the Great Powers did not adopt this idea because Serbia and Greece opposed it. In 1924, the Communist International (Comintern) suggested that all Balkan communist parties adopt a platform of a "United Macedonia" but the suggestion was rejected by the Bulgarian and Greek communists.

IMRO followed by starting an insurgent war in Vardar Macedonia, together with Macedonian Youth Secret Revolutionary Organization, which also conducted guerrilla attacks against the Serbian administrative and army officials there. In 1923 in Stip, a paramilitary organisation called Association against Bulgarian Bandits was formed by Serbian chetniks, IMRO renegades and Macedonian Federative Organization (MFO) members to oppose IMRO and MMTRO. On 9 October 1934 IMRO member Vlado Chernozemski assassinated Alexander I of Yugoslavia.

The Macedonist ideas increased in Yugoslav Vardar Macedonia and among the left diaspora in Bulgaria during the interwar period. They were supported by the Comintern. In 1934, the Comintern issued a special resolution in which for the first time directions were provided for recognising the existence of a separate Macedonian nation and Macedonian language.

World War II 

During World War II, Yugoslavia was occupied by the Axis powers from 1941 to 1945. The Vardar Banovina was divided between Bulgaria and Italian-occupied Albania. Bulgarian Action Committees were established to prepare the region for the new Bulgarian administration and army. The committees were mostly formed by former members of IMRO and Macedonian Youth Secret Revolutionary Organization (MYSRO, but some IMRO (United) former members also participated.

As leader of the Vardar Macedonian communists, Metodi Shatorov ("Sharlo") switched from the Yugoslav Communist Party to the Bulgarian Communist Party and refused to start military action against the Bulgarian Army. The Bulgarian authorities, under German pressure, were responsible for the round-up and deportation of over 7,000 Jews in Skopje and Bitola. Harsh rule by the occupying forces encouraged many Vardar Macedonians to support the Communist Partisan resistance movement of Josip Broz Tito after 1943, and the National Liberation War ensued.

In Vardar Macedonia, after the Bulgarian coup d'état of 1944, the Bulgarian troops, surrounded by German forces, fought their way back to the old borders of Bulgaria. Under the leadership of the new Bulgarian pro-Soviet government, four armies, 455,000 strong in total, were mobilised and reorganised. Most of them re-entered occupied Yugoslavia in early October 1944 and moved from Sofia to Niš, Skopje and Pristina with the strategic task of blocking the German forces withdrawing from Greece. The Bulgarian army would reach the Alps in Austria, participating in the expulsion of the Germans to the west, through Yugoslavia and Hungary.

Compelled by the Soviet Union with a view towards the creation of a large South Slav Federation, in 1946 the new Communist government, led by Georgi Dimitrov, agreed to give Bulgarian Macedonia to a United Macedonia. With the Bled agreement, in 1947 Bulgaria formally confirmed the envisioned unification of the Macedonian region, but postponed this act until after the formation of the future Federation. It was the first time it accepted the existence of a separate Macedonian ethnicity and language. After the Tito–Stalin split the region of Pirin Macedonia remained part of Bulgaria and later the Bulgarian Communist Party revised its view of the existence of a separate Macedonian nation and language.

Socialist Yugoslavia 

In December 1944 the Anti-fascist Assembly for the National Liberation of Macedonia (ASNOM) proclaimed the People's Republic of Macedonia as part of the People's Federal Republic of Yugoslavia. ASNOM remained an acting government until the end of the war. The Macedonian alphabet was codified by linguists of ASNOM, who based their alphabet on the phonetic alphabet of Vuk Stefanović Karadžić and the principles of Krste Petkov Misirkov. During the civil war in Greece (1946–1949), Macedonian communist insurgents supported the Greek communists. Many refugees fled to the Socialist Republic of Macedonia from there. The state dropped Socialist from its name in 1991 when it peacefully seceded from Yugoslavia.

The new republic became one of the six republics of the Yugoslav federation. Following the federation's renaming as the Socialist Federal Republic of Yugoslavia in 1963, the People's Republic of Macedonia was likewise renamed the Socialist Republic of Macedonia.

Declaration of independence 

North Macedonia officially celebrates 8 September 1991 as Independence day (Den na nezavisnosta), with regard to the referendum endorsing independence from Yugoslavia. The anniversary of the start of the Ilinden Uprising (St. Elijah's Day) on 2 August is also widely celebrated on an official level as the Day of the Republic.

Robert Badinter, as the head of the Arbitration Commission of the Peace Conference on Yugoslavia, recommended EC recognition in January 1992. On 15 January 1992, Bulgaria was the first country to recognise the independence of the republic.

Macedonia remained at peace through the Yugoslav Wars of the early 1990s. A few very minor changes to its border with Yugoslavia were agreed upon to resolve problems with the demarcation line between the two countries. It was seriously destabilised by the Kosovo War in 1999, when an estimated 360,000 ethnic Albanian refugees from Kosovo took refuge in the country. They departed shortly after the war, and Albanian nationalists on both sides of the border took up arms soon after in pursuit of autonomy or independence for the Albanian-populated areas of Macedonia.

21st century

2001 insurgency 

A conflict took place between the government and ethnic Albanian insurgents, mostly in the north and west of the country, between February and August 2001. The war ended with the intervention of a NATO ceasefire monitoring force. Under the terms of the Ohrid Agreement, the government agreed to devolve greater political power and cultural recognition to the Albanian minority. The Albanian side agreed to abandon separatist demands and to recognise all Macedonian institutions fully. In addition, according to this accord, the NLA were to disarm and hand over their weapons to a NATO force. However the Macedonian security forces had two more armed confrontations with Albanian militant groups, in 2007 and 2015 respectively.

Inter-ethnic tensions flared in Macedonia in 2012, with incidents of violence between ethnic Albanians and Macedonians. In April 2017, a mob of Macedonian nationalists stormed the Macedonian Parliament in response to the election of Talat Xhaferi, an ethnic Albanian and former National Liberation Army commander during the 2001 conflict, as the Speaker of the Assembly.

Antiquisation 

Upon its coming to power in 2006, but especially since the country's non-invitation to NATO in 2008, the VMRO-DPMNE government pursued a policy of "Antiquisation" ("Antikvizatzija") as a way of putting pressure on Greece as well as for the purposes of domestic identity-building. Statues of Alexander the Great and Philip of Macedon have been built in several cities across the country. Additionally, many pieces of public infrastructure, such as airports, highways, and stadiums were renamed after Alexander and Philip. These actions were seen as deliberate provocations in neighbouring Greece, exacerbating the dispute and further stalling the country's EU and NATO applications. The policy has also attracted criticism domestically, as well as from EU diplomats, and, following the Prespa agreement, it has been partly reversed after 2016 by the new SDSM government of North Macedonia. Moreover, per Prespa agreement both countries have acknowledged that their respective understanding of the terms "Macedonia" and "Macedonian" refers to a different historical context and cultural heritage.

EU and NATO path 

In August 2017, what was then the Republic of Macedonia signed a friendship agreement with Bulgaria, aiming to end the "anti-Bulgarian ideology" in the country and to solve the historical issues between the two.

Under the Prespa agreement, signed with Greece on 17 June 2018, the country agreed to change its name to the Republic of North Macedonia and stop public use of the Vergina Sun. It retained the demonym "Macedonian", but clarified this as distinct from the Hellenistic Macedonian identity in northern Greece. The agreement included removal of irredentist material from textbooks and maps in both countries, and official UN recognition of the Slavic Macedonian language. It replaced the bilateral Interim Accord of 1995.

The withdrawal of the Greek veto, along with the signing the friendship agreement with Bulgaria, resulted in the European Union on 27 June approving the start of accession talks, which were expected to take place in 2019, under the condition that the Prespa deal was implemented. On 5 July, the Prespa agreement was ratified by the Macedonian parliament with 69 MPs voting in favour of it. On 12 July, NATO invited Macedonia to start accession talks in a bid to become the alliance's 30th member. On 30 July, the parliament of Macedonia approved plans to hold a non-binding referendum on changing the country's name, which took place on 30 September. Ninety-one percent of voters voted in favour with a 37% turnout, but the referendum was not carried because of a constitutional requirement for a 50% turnout.

On 6 February 2019, the permanent representatives of NATO member states and Macedonian Foreign Affairs Minister Nikola Dimitrov, signed in Brussels the accession protocol of North Macedonia into NATO. The protocol was then ratified on 8 February by the Greek parliament, thus completing all the preconditions for putting into force the Prespa agreement. Subsequently, on 12 February the Macedonian government announced the formal activation of the constitutional amendments which effectively renamed the country as North Macedonia and informed accordingly the United Nations and its member states.

In March 2020, after the ratification process by all NATO members was completed, North Macedonia acceded to NATO, becoming the 30th member state. The same month, the leaders of the European Union formally gave approval to North Macedonia to begin talks to join the EU. On 17 November 2020, Bulgaria refused to approve the European Union's negotiation framework for North Macedonia, effectively blocking the official start of accession talks with this country. The explanation from the Bulgarian side was: no implementation of the friendship treaty from 2017, state-supported hate speech, minority claims, and an "ongoing nation-building process" based on historical negationism of the Bulgarian identity, culture and legacy in the broader region of Macedonia. The veto received condemnation by intellectuals from both states and criticism from international observers.

Protests broke out in July 2022, organized by the opposition parties, over the French proposal for the accession of North Macedonia to the EU. The accession talks for the accession of North Macedonia to the EU officially began in the same month, after the French proposal was passed by the Assembly of North Macedonia.

Geography

Location 

It lies between latitudes 40° and 43° N, and mostly between longitudes 20° and 23° E (a small area lies east of 23°). It is a transit way for shipment of goods from Greece, through the Balkans, towards Eastern, Western and Central Europe and through Bulgaria to the east. It is part of the larger region of Macedonia, which also includes Greek Macedonia and the Blagoevgrad Province in southwestern Bulgaria.

North Macedonia is a landlocked country that is geographically clearly defined by a central valley formed by the Vardar river and framed along its borders by mountain ranges. The terrain is mostly rugged, located between the Šar Mountains and Osogovo, which frame the valley of the Vardar river. Three large lakes—Lake Ohrid, Lake Prespa and Dojran Lake—lie on the southern borders, bisected by the frontiers with Albania and Greece. Ohrid is considered to be one of the oldest lakes and biotopes in the world. The region is seismically active and has been the site of destructive earthquakes in the past, most recently in 1963 when Skopje was heavily damaged by a major earthquake, killing over 1,000.

North Macedonia also has scenic mountains. They belong to two different mountain ranges: the first is the Šar Mountains that continues to the West Vardar/Pelagonia group of mountains (Baba Mountain, Nidže, Kožuf and Jakupica), also known as the Dinaric range. The second range is the Osogovo–Belasica mountain chain, also known as the Rhodope range. The mountains belonging to the Šar Mountains and the West Vardar/Pelagonia range are younger and higher than the older mountains of the Osogovo-Belasica mountain group. In North Macedonia there are 1,100 large sources of water. The rivers flow into three different basins: the Aegean, the Adriatic and the Black Sea.

The Aegean basin is the largest. Its valley plays an important part in the economy and the communication system of the country. The Vardar Valley project is considered to be crucial for the strategic development of the country. It receives water from Lakes Prespa and Ohrid. The Black Sea basin is the smallest with only . It covers the northern side of Mount Skopska Crna Gora. This is the source of the river Binachka Morava, which joins the Morava, and later, the Danube, which flows into the Black Sea. North Macedonia has around fifty ponds and three natural lakes, Lake Ohrid, Lake Prespa and Lake Dojran. In North Macedonia there are nine spa towns and resorts: Banište, Banja Bansko, Istibanja, Katlanovo, Kežovica, Kosovrasti, Banja Kočani, Kumanovski Banji and Negorci.

Climate 

Four different seasons are found in the country with warm and dry summers and moderately cold and snowy winters. Low winter temperatures are influenced by winds from the north while heat seasons during summer arise due to the subtropical pressure of the Aegean Sea and climate influences from the Middle East, with the latter causing dry periods. There are three main climatic zones in the country: mildly continental in the north, temperate Mediterranean in the south and mountainous in the zones with high altitude. Along the valleys of the Vardar and Strumica rivers, in the regions of Gevgelija, Valandovo, Dojran, Strumica, and Radoviš, the climate is temperate Mediterranean. The warmest regions are Demir Kapija and Gevgelija, where the temperature in July and August frequently exceeds .

The climate and irrigation diversity allow the cultivation of different plant types, including wheat, corn, potatoes, poppies, peanuts, and rice. There are thirty main and regular weather stations in the country.

Biodiversity 

The flora of North Macedonia is represented by around 210 families, 920 genera, and around 3,700 plant species. The most abundant group are the flowering plants with around 3,200 species, followed by mosses (350 species) and ferns (42).

Phytogeographically, North Macedonia belongs to the Illyrian province of the Circumboreal Region within the Boreal Kingdom. According to the World Wide Fund for Nature (WWF) and the Digital Map of European Ecological Regions by the European Environment Agency, the territory of the Republic can be subdivided into four terrestrial ecoregions: the Pindus Mountains mixed forests, Balkan mixed forests, Rodope montane mixed forests, and Aegean and Western Turkey sclerophyllous and mixed forests. North Macedonia had a 2019 Forest Landscape Integrity Index mean score of 7.42/10, ranking it 40th globally out of 172 countries.

The native forest fauna is abundant and includes bears, wild boars, wolves, foxes, squirrels, chamois and deer. The lynx is found, very rarely, in the mountains of western Macedonia, while deer can be found in the region of Demir Kapija. Forest birds include the blackcap, the grouse, the black grouse, the imperial eagle and the forest owl.

The country has four national parks:

Politics 

North Macedonia is a parliamentary democracy with an executive government composed of a coalition of parties from the unicameral legislature (Assembly in English) and an independent judicial branch with a constitutional court. The Assembly is made up of 120 seats and the members are elected every four years. The role of the president is mostly ceremonial, with the real power resting in the hands of the prime minister. The president is the commander-in-chief of the state armed forces and a president of the State Security Council. The president is elected every five years and he or she can be elected twice at most.

Since 2019, local government functions are divided between 80 municipalities (singular:). The capital, Skopje, is governed as a group of ten municipalities collectively referred to as the "City of Skopje". Municipalities in North Macedonia are units of local self-government. Neighbouring municipalities may establish co-operative arrangements.

The country's main political divergence is between the largely ethnically based political parties representing the country's ethnic Macedonian majority and Albanian minority. The issue of the power balance between the two communities led to a brief war in 2001, following which a power-sharing agreement was reached. In August 2004, parliament passed legislation redrawing local boundaries and giving greater local autonomy to ethnic Albanians in areas where they predominate.

After a troublesome pre-election campaign, North Macedonia saw a relatively calm and democratic change of government in the elections held on 5 July 2006. The elections were marked by a decisive victory of the centre-right party VMRO-DPMNE led by Nikola Gruevski. Gruevski's decision to include the Democratic Party of Albanians in the new government, instead of the Democratic Union for Integration–Party for Democratic Prosperity coalition which won the majority of the Albanian votes, triggered protests throughout the parts of the country with a respective number of Albanian population. A dialogue was later established between the Democratic Union for Integration and the ruling VMRO-DMPNE party as an effort to talk about the disputes between the two parties and to support European and NATO aspirations of the country.

After the early parliamentary elections held in 2008, VMRO-DPMNE and Democratic Union for Integration formed a ruling coalition. In April 2009, presidential and local elections in the country were carried out peacefully, which was crucial for Macedonian aspirations to join the EU. The ruling conservative VMRO-DPMNE party won a victory in the local elections and the candidate supported by the party, Gjorgi Ivanov, was elected as the new president.

In June 2017, Zoran Zaev of the Social Democratic Party, became the new prime minister six months after early elections. The new center-left government ended 11 years of conservative VMRO-DPMNE rule led by former prime minister Nikola Gruevski.

, the acting prime minister of North Macedonia was Oliver Spasovski and the current president of the Parliament is Talat Xhaferi. The election of Xhaferi was immediately met with protests led by VMRO-DPMNE, which was quickly handled by the police.

The early parliamentary elections took place on 15 July 2020. Zoran Zaev has served as the prime minister of the Republic of North Macedonia again since August 2020. Stevo Pendarovski was sworn in as North Macedonia's new president in May 2019. Prime minister Zoran Zaev announced his resignation after his party, the Social Democratic Union, suffered losses in local elections in October 2021. In January 2022, Dimitar Kovačevski was elected as prime minister. The new coalition cabinet composed of Kovačevski's Social Democrats and two ethnic Albanian parties.

Parliament, or Assembly, is the country's legislative body. It makes, proposes and adopts laws. The Constitution of North Macedonia has been in use since shortly after the independence of the republic in 1991. It limits the power of the governments, both local and national. The military is also limited by the constitution. The constitution states that North Macedonia is a social free state, and that Skopje is the capital. The 120 members are elected for a mandate of four years through a general election. Each citizen aged 18 years or older can vote for one of the political parties. The current president of Parliament is since 2017 an ethnic Albanian, Talat Xhaferi.

Executive power in North Macedonia is exercised by the Government, whose prime minister is the most politically powerful person in the country. The members of the government are chosen by the prime minister and there are ministers for each branch of the society. There are ministers for economy, finance, information technology, society, internal affairs, foreign affairs and other areas. The members of the Government are elected for a mandate of four years. Judiciary power is exercised by courts, with the court system being headed by the Judicial Supreme court, Constitutional Court and the Republican Judicial Council. The assembly appoints the judges.

Foreign relations 

North Macedonia became a member state of the UN on 8 April 1993, eighteen months after its independence from Yugoslavia. It was referred to within the UN as "the former Yugoslav Republic of Macedonia", until the resolution of the long-running dispute with Greece about the country's name.

The major interest of the country is a full integration in the European and the Trans-Atlantic integration processes.

North Macedonia is a member of the following international and regional organisations: IMF (since 1992), WHO (since 1993), EBRD (since 1993), Central European Initiative (since 1993), Council of Europe (since 1995), OSCE (since 1995), SECI (since 1996), La Francophonie (since 2001), WTO (since 2003), CEFTA (since 2006), NATO (since 2020).

In 2005, the country was officially recognised as a European Union candidate state.

At the NATO 2008 Bucharest summit, Macedonia failed to gain an invitation to join the organisation because Greece vetoed the move after the dispute over the name issue. The U.S. had previously expressed support for an invitation, but the summit then decided to extend an invitation only on condition of a resolution of the naming conflict with Greece.

In March 2009, the European Parliament expressed support for North Macedonia's EU candidacy and asked the EU Commission to grant the country a date for the start of accession talks by the end of 2009. The parliament also recommended a speedy lifting of the visa regime for Macedonian citizens. Prior to the Prespa agreement, the country failed to receive a start date for accession talks as a result of the naming dispute. However, after the Prespa agreement, North Macedonia became a member state of NATO on 27 March 2020. The EU's stance was similar to NATO's in that resolution of the naming dispute was a precondition for the start of accession talks.

In October 2012, the EU Enlargement Commissioner Štefan Füle proposed a start of accession negotiations with the country for the fourth time, while the previous efforts were blocked each time by Greece. At the same time Füle visited Bulgaria in a bid to clarify the state's position with respect to Macedonia. He established that Bulgaria had almost joined Greece in vetoing the accession talks. The Bulgarian position was that Sofia cannot grant an EU certificate to Skopje, which is systematically employing an ideology of hate towards Bulgaria.

Military 

The military of North Macedonia comprises the army, air force, and special forces. The government's national defence policy aims to guarantee the preservation of the independence and sovereignty of the state, the integrity of its land area and airspace and its constitutional order. Its main goals remain the development and maintenance of a credible capability to defend the nation's vital interests and development of the Armed Forces in a way that ensures their interoperability with the armed forces of NATO and the European Union member states and their capability to participate in the full range of NATO missions.

The Ministry of Defence develops the Republic's defence strategy and assesses possible threats and risks. It is also responsible for the defence system, including training, readiness, equipment, and development, and for drawing up and presenting the defence budget.

Naming dispute 

The use of the name "Macedonia" was disputed between Greece and North Macedonia. The specific naming dispute was reignited after the breakup of Yugoslavia and the newly gained independence of the former Socialist Republic of Macedonia in 1991. Greece opposed the use of the name without a geographical qualifier so as to avoid confusion with its own region of Greek Macedonia to the south. As some ethnic Greeks identify themselves as Macedonians, unrelated to the Slavic people who are associated with North Macedonia, Greece further objected to the use of the term Macedonian for the neighbouring country's largest ethnic group; it accused the country of appropriating symbols and figures that are historically considered parts of Greece's culture (such as Vergina Sun and Alexander the Great), and of promoting the irredentist concept of a United Macedonia, which would include territories of Greece, Bulgaria, Albania, and Serbia.

The UN adopted the provisional reference the former Yugoslav Republic of Macedonia when the country was admitted to the organisation in 1993. The lower-cased "former" was chosen intentionally to display the provisionality of the name although most UN member countries soon abandoned the provisional reference and recognised the country as the Republic of Macedonia instead. Most international organisations adopted the same convention along with over 100 UN members and four of the five permanent UN Security Council members. In the period between 1991 and 2019, the country's name was an ongoing issue in bilateral and international relations. The UN set up a negotiating process with a mediator, Matthew Nimetz, and the two parties to try to mediate the dispute. Following the ratification of the Prespa agreement, most major international organisations welcomed the settlement of the long-standing dispute, and adopted the country's new name.

Human rights 

North Macedonia is a signatory to the European Convention on Human Rights and the UN Geneva Convention Relating to the Status of Refugees and Convention against Torture, and the Constitution guarantees basic human rights to all Macedonian citizens.

According to human rights organisations, in 2003 there were suspected extrajudicial executions, threats against, and intimidation of, human rights activists and opposition journalists, and allegations of torture by the police.

Subdivisions 

 

North Macedonia's statistical regions exist solely for legal and statistical purposes. The regions are:
 Eastern
 Northeastern
 Pelagonia
 Polog
 Skopje
 Southeastern
 Southwestern
 Vardar

In August 2004, the country was reorganised into 84 municipalities (sing. ); 10 of the municipalities constitute the City of Skopje, a distinct unit of local self-government and the country's capital.

Most of the current municipalities were unaltered or merely amalgamated from the previous 123 municipalities established in September 1996; others were consolidated and their borders changed. Prior to this, local government was organised into 34 administrative districts, communes, or counties (also opštini).

Economy 

Ranked as the fourth "best reformatory state" out of 178 countries ranked by the World Bank in 2009, North Macedonia has undergone considerable economic reform since independence. The country has developed an open economy with trade accounting for more than 90% of GDP in recent years. Since 1996, North Macedonia has witnessed steady, though slow, economic growth with GDP growing by 3.1% in 2005. This figure was projected to rise to an average of 5.2% in the 2006–2010 period. The government has proven successful in its efforts to combat inflation, with an inflation rate of only 3% in 2006 and 2% in 2007, and has implemented policies focused on attracting foreign investment and promoting the development of small and medium-sized enterprises (SMEs).

The current government introduced a flat tax system with the intention of making the country more attractive to foreign investment. The flat tax rate was 12% in 2007 and was further lowered to 10% in 2008.
 North Macedonia's unemployment rate was 37.2% and  its poverty rate was 22%. Due to a number of employment measures as well as the successful process of attracting multinational corporations, and according to the State Statistical Office of North Macedonia, the country's unemployment rate in the first quarter of 2015 decreased to 27.3%. Government's policies and efforts in regards to foreign direct investments have resulted with the establishment of local subsidiaries of several world leading manufacturing companies, especially from the automotive industry, such as: Johnson Controls Inc., Van Hool NV, Johnson Matthey plc, Lear Corp., Visteon Corp., Kostal GmbH, Gentherm Inc., Dräxlmaier Group, Kromberg & Schubert, Marquardt GmbH, Amphenol Corp., Tekno Hose SpA, KEMET Corp., Key Safety Systems Inc., ODW-Elektrik GmbH, etc.

In terms of GDP structure,  the manufacturing sector, including mining and construction constituted the largest part of GDP at 21.4%, up from 21.1% in 2012. The trade, transportation and accommodation sector represents 18.2% of GDP in 2013, up from 16.7% in 2012, while agriculture represents 9.6%, up from 9.1% in the previous year.

In terms of foreign trade, the largest sector contributing to the country's export in 2014 was "chemicals and related products" at 21.4%, followed by the "machinery and transport equipment" sector at 21.1%. North Macedonia's main import sectors in 2014 were "manufactured goods classified chiefly by material" with 34.2%, "machinery and transport equipment" with 18.7% and "mineral fuels, lubricants and related materials" with 14.4% of the total imports. Even 68.8% of the foreign trade in 2014 was done with the EU which makes the Union by far the largest trading partner of North Macedonia (23.3% with Germany, 7.9% with the UK, 7.3% with Greece, 6.2% with Italy, etc.). Almost 12% of the total external trade in 2014 was done with the Western Balkan countries.

North Macedonia has one of the highest shares of people struggling financially, with 72% of its citizens stating that they could manage on their household's income only "with difficulty" or "with great difficulty", though North Macedonia, along with Croatia, was the only country in the Western Balkans to not report an increase in this statistic. Corruption and a relatively ineffective legal system also act as significant restraints on successful economic development. North Macedonia still has one of the lowest per capita GDPs in Europe. Furthermore, the country's grey market is estimated at close to 20% of GDP. PPS GDP per capita stood at 36% of the EU average in 2017. With a GDP per capita of US$9,157 at purchasing power parity and a Human Development Index of 0.701, North Macedonia is less developed and has a considerably smaller economy than most of the former Yugoslav states.

Trade 

The outbreak of the Yugoslav wars and the imposition of sanctions on Serbia and Montenegro caused great damage to the country's economy, with Serbia constituting 60% of its markets before the disintegration of Yugoslavia. When Greece imposed a trade embargo on the Republic in 1994–95, the economy was also affected. Some relief was afforded by the end of the Bosnian War in November 1995 and the lifting of the Greek embargo, but the Kosovo War of 1999 and the 2001 Albanian crisis caused further destabilisation.

Since the end of the Greek embargo, Greece has become the country's most important business partner. (See Greek investments in North Macedonia.) Many Greek companies have bought former state companies in North Macedonia, such as the oil refinery Okta, the baking company Zhito Luks, a marble mine in Prilep, textile facilities in Bitola, etc., and employ 20,000 people. The moving of business to North Macedonia in the oil sector has been caused by the rise of Greece in the oil markets.

Other key partners are Germany, Italy, the United States, Slovenia, Austria and Turkey.

Tourism 

Tourism plays a significant role in the economy of North Macedonia accounting for 6.7% of its GDP in 2016. The annual income from tourism was estimated at 38.5 billion denars (€616 million) in that year. Following its independence, the most serious negative impact on tourism performance occurred due to the armed conflicts taking place in 2001. The number of foreign visitors has been on the rise since, with a 14.6% increase in 2011. In 2019, North Macedonia received 1,184,963 tourist arrivals out of which 757,593 foreign. Most numerous are tourists from Turkey, neighboring Serbia, Greece and Bulgaria, Poland and other countries of Western Europe. The biggest bulk of tourists, approximately 60% of the million tourists that visited the country in 2017, was situated in Skopje and the southwestern region of the country.

The most significant tourism branches are lake tourism as there are three lakes in Ohrid, Prespa and Dojran and over 50 small glacial lakes of variable sizes, mountainous tourism as there are 16 mountains higher than 2,000 metres. Other forms of tourism also include rural and ecotourism, city tourism and cultural tourism, represented through gastronomy, traditional music, cultural celebrations and cultural heritage sites.

Infrastructure

Transport 

North Macedonia (along with Montenegro, Bosnia and Herzegovina and Kosovo) belongs to the less-developed southern region of the former Yugoslavia. It suffered severe economic difficulties after independence, when the Yugoslav internal market collapsed and subsidies from Belgrade ended. In addition, it faced many of the same problems faced by other former socialist East European countries during the transition to a market economy. Its main land and rail exports route, through Serbia, remains unreliable with high transit costs, thereby affecting the export of its formerly highly profitable, early vegetables market to Germany.

North Macedonia's IT market increased 63.8% year on year in 2007, which was the fastest growing in the Adriatic region.

North Macedonia is in its position a continental country in the middle of the Balkan peninsula, and the main transport links in the country are those that connect the different parts of the peninsula (transbalkan links). Particularly important is the connection between north–south and Vardar valley, which connects Greece with the rest of Europe.

Operated by Makedonski Železnici, the most important railway line is the line on the border with Serbia–Kumanovo–Skopje–Veles–Gevgelija–border with Greece. Since 2001, the railway line Beljakovci has been built—the border with Bulgaria, which will get a direct connection Skopje-Sofia. The most important railway hub in the country is Skopje, while the other two are Veles and Kumanovo.

North Macedonia Post is the state-owned company for the provision of postal traffic. It was founded in 1992 as PTT Macedonia. In 1993 it was admitted to the World Postal Union in 1997, PTT Macedonia was divided into Macedonian Telekom and Macedonian Post (later renamed North Macedonia Post).

As far as water transport is concerned, only lake traffic through Ohrid and Prespan Lake has been developed, mostly for tourist purposes.

There are 17 airports officially in North Macedonia, of which 11 are with solid substrates. Among them are two airports of international character, since they are listed on the airport's IATA airport code International Airport Skopje and Ohrid St. Paul the Apostle Airport.

Education 

The higher levels of education can be obtained at one of the five state universities: Ss. Cyril and Methodius University of Skopje, St. Clement of Ohrid University of Bitola, Goce Delčev University of Štip, State University of Tetova and University of Information Science and Technology "St. Paul The Apostle" in Ohrid. There are a number of private university institutions, such as the European University, Slavic University in Sveti Nikole, the South East European University and others. North Macedonia was ranked 59th in the Global Innovation Index in 2021 and 2019. 

The United States Agency for International Development has underwritten a project called Macedonia Connects, which has made North Macedonia the first all-broadband wireless country in the world. The Ministry of Education and Sciences reports that 461 schools (primary and secondary) are now connected to the Internet. In addition, an Internet service provider (On.net), has created a MESH Network to provide WIFI services in the 11 largest cities/towns in the country. The national library of North Macedonia, National and University Library "St. Kliment of Ohrid", is in Skopje.

Demographics 

Census data from 2002 shows a population of 2,022,547 inhabitants. An official estimate from 2009, without significant change, gives a figure of 2,050,671. The results from the last 2021 census show a population of 1,836,713. 

According to the 2002 census data, the largest ethnic group in the country are the ethnic Macedonians. The second-largest group are the Albanians, who dominated much of the northwestern part of the country. Following them, Turks are the third-biggest ethnic group of the country where official census data put them close to 80,000 and unofficial estimates suggest numbers between 170,000 and 200,000. Some unofficial estimates indicate that there are possibly up to 260,000 Romani.

Religion

Eastern Orthodox Christianity is the majority faith of North Macedonia, making up 65% of the population, the vast majority of whom belong to the Macedonian Orthodox Church. Various other Christian denominations account for 0.4% of the population. Muslims constitute 33.3% of the population. North Macedonia has the fifth-highest proportion of Muslims in Europe, after those of Kosovo (96%), Turkey (90%), Albania (59%), and Bosnia and Herzegovina (51%).
Most Muslims are Albanians, Turks, or Romani; few are Macedonian Muslims. The remaining 1.4% was determined to be "unaffiliated" by a 2010 Pew Research estimation.

There were 1,842 churches and 580 mosques in the country at the end of 2011. The Orthodox and Islamic religious communities have secondary religion schools in Skopje. There is an Orthodox theological college in the capital. The Macedonian Orthodox Church has jurisdiction over 10 provinces (seven in the country and three abroad), has 10 bishops and about 350 priests. A total of 30,000 people are baptised in all the provinces every year.

The Macedonian Orthodox Church, which declared autocephaly in 1967, remained unrecognised by the other Orthodox Churches until 2022 when it restored relations with the Serbian Orthodox Church and the Ecumenical Patriarchate, which has been followed by recognition from other churches.

The reaction of the Macedonian Orthodox Church was to cut off all relations with the new Ohrid Archbishopric and to prevent bishops of the Serbian Orthodox Church from entering North Macedonia. Bishop Jovan was jailed for 18 months for "defaming the Macedonian Orthodox church and harming the religious feelings of local citizens" by distributing Serbian Orthodox church calendars and pamphlets.

The Macedonian Byzantine Catholic Church has approximately 11,000 adherents in North Macedonia. The Church was established in 1918, and is made up mostly of converts to Catholicism and their descendants. The Church is of the Byzantine Rite and is in communion with the Roman and Eastern Catholic Churches. Its liturgical worship is performed in Macedonian.

There is a small Protestant community. The most famous Protestant in the country is the late president Boris Trajkovski. He was from the Methodist community, which is the largest and oldest Protestant church in the Republic, dating back to the late 19th century. Since the 1980s the Protestant community has grown, partly through new confidence and partly with outside missionary help.

The country's Jewish community, which numbered some 7,200 people on the eve of World War II, was almost entirely destroyed during the war: only 2% survived the Holocaust.

After their liberation and the end of the War, most opted to emigrate to Israel. Today, the country's Jewish community numbers approximately 200 persons, almost all of whom live in Skopje. Most Macedonian Jews are Sephardic—the descendants of 15th-century refugees who had been expelled from Castile, Aragon and Portugal.

Languages

The national and official language in all aspects of the whole territory of North Macedonia and in its international relations is the Macedonian language. Albanian is co-official at a state level (excluding defence, central police and monetary policy) and in local self-government units where speakers are 20% or more. Macedonian belongs to the Eastern branch of the South Slavic language group, while Albanian occupies an independent branch of the Indo-European family of languages. In municipalities where at least 20% of the population is part of another ethnic minority, those individual languages are used for official purposes in local government, alongside Macedonian and Albanian or just Macedonian.

Macedonian is closely related to and mutually intelligible with standard Bulgarian. It also has some similarities with standard Serbian and the intermediate Torlakian/Shop dialects spoken mostly in southeastern Serbia and western Bulgaria (and by speakers in the northeast of Macedonia). The standard language was codified in the period following World War II and has accumulated a thriving literary tradition.

Besides Macedonian and Albanian, minority languages with substantial numbers of speakers are Turkish (including Balkan Gagauz), Romani, Serbian/Bosnian and Aromanian (including Megleno-Romanian). Macedonian Sign Language is the primary language of those of the deaf community who did not pick up an oral language in childhood.

According to the last census, 1,344,815 citizens of North Macedonia declared that they spoke Macedonian, 507,989 declared Albanian, 71,757 Turkish, 38,528 Romani, 24,773 Serbian, 8,560 Bosnian, 6,884 Aromanian and 19,241 spoke other languages.

Cities

Culture

North Macedonia has a rich cultural heritage in art, architecture, poetry and music. It has many ancient, protected religious sites. Poetry, cinema, and music festivals are held annually. Macedonian music styles developed under the strong influence of Byzantine church music. North Macedonia has a significant number of preserved Byzantine fresco paintings, mainly from the period between the 11th and 16th centuries. There are several thousands of square metres of fresco painting preserved, the major part of which is in very good condition and represent masterworks of the Macedonian school of ecclesiastical painting.

The most important cultural events in the country are the Ohrid Summer festival of classical music and drama, the Struga Poetry Evenings which gather poets from more than 50 countries in the world, International Camera Festival in Bitola, Open Youth Theatre and Skopje Jazz Festival in Skopje etc.
The National Opera opened in 1947, then named "Macedonian Opera", with a performance of Cavalleria rusticana under the direction of Branko Pomorisac. Every year, the May Opera Evenings are held in Skopje for around 20 nights. The first May Opera performance was that of Kiril Makedonski's Tsar Samuil in May 1972.

Cuisine

The country's cuisine is representative of that of the Balkans—reflecting Mediterranean and Middle Eastern (Ottoman) influences, and to a lesser extent Italian, German and Eastern European (especially Hungarian) ones. The relatively warm climate in North Macedonia provides excellent growth conditions for a variety of vegetables, herbs and fruits. Thus, Macedonian cuisine is particularly diverse.

Macedonian cuisine is also noted for the diversity and quality of its dairy products, wines, and local alcoholic beverages, such as rakija. Tavče gravče and mastika are considered the national dish and drink of North Macedonia, respectively. Some other important dishes include Šopska salad, an appetiser and side dish that accompanies the main meal, ajvar, stuffed peppers, pastrmajlija and others.

Sport

Football, handball, and basketball are the most popular sports in North Macedonia. The North Macedonia national football team is controlled by the Football Federation of Macedonia. Their home stadium is the Toše Proeski Arena. In November 2003, to celebrate UEFA's jubilee, Darko Pančev was selected as the Golden Player of Macedonia as their most outstanding player of the past 50 years. He was the winner of the European Golden Boot award in 1991 and he is best known for scoring the winning penalty in the 1991 European Cup Final, bringing Red Star Belgrade the most prestigious trophy in European football for the first time in its 50-year existence. In 2020, the national team qualified for UEFA Euro 2020 (held in 2021), their first major tournament in the country's history.

Handball is the other important team sport in the country. Macedonian clubs have enjoyed success in European competitions. RK Vardar won 2016–17 and 2018–19 EHF Champions League, while Kometal Gjorče Petrov Skopje won the 2002 EHF Women's Champions League. The European Women's Handball Championship took place in 2008 in North Macedonia in Skopje and Ohrid; the women's national team finished seventh place. The country's men's national team has appeared in the European and World championships multiple times, with a best finish of fifth at the former (2012) and ninth at the latter (2015).

The North Macedonia national basketball team represents North Macedonia in international basketball. The team is run by the Basketball Federation of North Macedonia, the governing body of basketball in North Macedonia which was created in 1992 and joined FIBA in 1993. North Macedonia has participated in three EuroBaskets since then with its best finish at 4th place in 2011. It plays its home games at the Boris Trajkovski Sports Center in Skopje. Pero Antić became the first Macedonian basketball player to play in the National Basketball Association. He also won three EuroLeague trophies.

In the summer months the Ohrid Swimming Marathon is an annual event on Lake Ohrid and during the winter months there is skiing in North Macedonia's winter sports centres. North Macedonia also takes part in the Olympic Games. Participation in the Games is organised by the Olympic Committee of North Macedonia. Magomed Ibragimov competed for Macedonia in the freestyle 85 kg competition at the 2000 Summer Olympics and won the bronze medal, which was the first medal for independent country. Wrestlers Shaban Trstena and Shaban Sejdiu born in North Macedonia, as well as boxers Redžep Redžepovski and Ace Rusevski, won Olympic medals as part of Yugoslav Olympic team.

Cinema

The history of film making in the country dates back over 110 years. The first film to be produced on the territory of the present-day country was made in 1895 by Janaki and Milton Manaki in Bitola. Throughout the past century, the medium of film has depicted the history, culture and everyday life of the Macedonian people. Over the years many Macedonian films have been presented at film festivals around the world and several of these films have won prestigious awards. The first Macedonian feature film was Frosina, released in 1952 and directed by Vojislav Nanović.

The first feature film in colour was Miss Stone, a movie about a Protestant missionary in Ottoman Macedonia. It was released in 1958. The highest grossing feature film in North Macedonia was Bal-Can-Can, having been seen by over 500,000 people in its first year alone. In 1994, Milcho Manchevski's film Before the Rain was nominated for an Academy Award in the category of Best International Feature Film. Manchevski continues to be the most prominent modern filmmaker in the country having subsequently written and directed Dust and Shadows. In 2020, the documentary Honeyland (2019) directed by Tamara Kotevska and Ljubomir Stefanov, received nominations in the categories for Best International Feature Film and Best Documentary Feature at the 92nd Academy Awards, making it the first non-fictional film to receive a nomination in both categories.

Media 

The oldest newspaper in the country is Nova Makedonija from 1944. Other well known newspaper and magazines are: Utrinski vesnik, Dnevnik, Vest, Fokus, Večer, Tea Moderna, Makedonsko Sonce, and Koha. Public channel is Macedonian Radio Television founded in 1993 by the Assembly of North Macedonia. TEKO TV (1989) from Štip is the first private television channel in the country. Other popular private channels are: Sitel, Kanal 5, Telma, Alfa TV, and Alsat-M.

Public holidays

The main public holidays in North Macedonia are:

Besides these, there are several major religious & minorities holidays. (See: Public holidays in North Macedonia)

Symbols

 Sun: The official flag of the Republic of North Macedonia, adopted in 1995, is a yellow sun with eight broadening rays extending to the edges of the red field.
 Coat of arms: After independence in 1991, North Macedonia retained the coat of arms adopted in 1946 by the People's Assembly of the People's Republic of Macedonia on its second extraordinary session held on 27 July 1946, later on altered by article 8 of the Constitution of the Socialist Federal Republic of Macedonia. The coat-of-arms is composed by a double bent garland of ears of wheat, tobacco and poppy, tied by a ribbon with the embroidery of a traditional folk costume. In the center of such a circular room there are mountains, rivers, lakes and the sun. All this is said to represent "the richness of our country, our struggle, and our freedom".

International rankings

See also

 Outline of North Macedonia

Notes

References

Bibliography

Further reading
 North Macedonia. The World Factbook. Central Intelligence Agency.

External links

 
 
 North Macedonia from RFE/RL
 North Macedonia from BBC News
 
 
 Key Development Forecasts for North Macedonia from International Futures

 
Balkan countries
Landlocked countries
Member states of the Council of Europe
Member states of the Organisation internationale de la Francophonie
Member states of the United Nations
Member states of NATO
Republics
Southeastern European countries
Southern European countries
States and territories established in 1991
1991 establishments in the Republic of Macedonia
Countries in Europe
Albanian-speaking countries and territories
Countries of Europe with multiple official languages